New Start is the debut release from Fastlane, which was released in March, 2005 by Suckapunch Records in the UK, and October, 2005 by Pyropit Records in Japan.

Track listing
 Virus
 Eyes Closed
 Summer Falls
 Dreaming
 Elevator
 Comfortable Silence
 A New Start
 3rd Degree
 Forget What We Were
 Million Times
 When It's Over

External links
 Official Website

2005 albums
Fastlane (band) albums